Cyril Ignatius Burke (14 October 1905 – 6 September 1984) was an Australian rules footballer who played with Richmond in the Victorian Football League (VFL).

Notes

External links 

1905 births
1984 deaths
Australian rules footballers from Victoria (Australia)
Richmond Football Club players
Old Xaverians Football Club players